Anna Silk (born 31 January 1974) is a Canadian actress best known for her role as Bo Dennis, the protagonist of the Showcase television series Lost Girl (2010–2015).

Personal life 

Silk was born in Fredericton, New Brunswick, Canada, the daughter of Peter Silk, an academic, and Ilkay Silk, an actress, director, producer, playwright, educator, and Director of Drama at St. Thomas University. Her father is British and her mother a "Turkish Cypriot-English expat". Some of Anna's earliest memories were of going to play rehearsals and watching her mother work. Silk appeared in several commercials as a child. She graduated from St. Thomas University with a Bachelor of Arts degree in 1997. Early theater work includes at least two productions with Theatre St. Thomas: Seven Menus and The Kitchen.

In November 1999, she moved to Toronto to further her acting career and during the following decade relocated to Los Angeles, California. She met Seth Cooperman in 2007 at an actor's workshop in Los Angeles; they became engaged in 2009, and married in a civil ceremony in December of the same year. On April 10, 2011, they renewed their vows in a Jewish ceremony in Fredericton after she converted to Judaism.

During a Showcase Lost Girl pre-show special on January 6, 2013, Silk announced that she was pregnant. On June 20, 2013, she announced via Twitter that she was ready to return to work on the series.

Silk gave birth to a son, Samuel Jerome Cooperman, in May 2013. Her second son, Levi Aaron Cooperman, was born on May 13, 2016.

Career 
Silk's television work includes the role of Cassidy Holland in Being Erica, for which she received a Gemini Awards nomination in 2009.

In 2009, she landed the principal role of Bo Dennis, a succubus, in the Canadian television series Lost Girl. The same-sex-lover pair of Bo (Silk's character) and Lauren (played by co-star Zoie Palmer) was included in news network CNN's list of all-time Favorite TV Couples; and declared Top TV Couple of 2013 by E! Entertainment Television.  As a result of the show's popularity, Silk garnered a prominent online following on social media.

Silk appeared in the recurring role of Roarke, a mercenary, in the 2019 series Blood & Treasure.

Filmography

Film

Television

Awards and nominations

Notes

References

External links 

 
 
 

1974 births
Living people
20th-century Canadian actresses
21st-century Canadian actresses
Canadian film actresses
Canadian stage actresses
Canadian television actresses
Actresses from New Brunswick
Canadian expatriate actresses in the United States
Jewish Canadian actresses
Converts to Judaism
People from Fredericton
St. Thomas University (New Brunswick) alumni
Canadian people of English descent
Canadian people of Turkish Cypriot descent